Erumeli Parameswaran Pillai (12 December 1932 – 7 February 2014) was a Malayalam-language writer, teacher, scholar, and literary critic from Kerala, India. He wrote over forty books, including five novels, four collections of stories, 11 scholarly works, and a few one-act plays and children's literature. He is also known for the work Malayala Sahityam Kalaghattangaliloode, a comprehensive history of Malayalam literature. He received the Kerala Sahitya Akademi Award for Overall Contributions in 2009.

Biography
Pillai was born on 12 December 1932 in Erumeli in the Kottayam district as the son of Velamparampil Krishna Pillai and Lakshmikuttyamma. He obtained MA degrees in Malayalam and Sociology from the University of Kerala and an MEd degree from the University of Madras. He became a school teacher in 1952 and worked in Travancore Devaswom Board High Schools in Erumeli, Thakazhi and Tiruvalla. He became a teacher at Farooq Training College near Calicut in 1964. In Calicut, he flourished as a writer, mainly influenced by the friendship he had with famous writers of the time Vaikom Muhammad Basheer and S. K. Pottekkatt.

He was the Secretary of Kerala Sahitya Akademi (1988-91) and the first Principal of the Kottayam BEd Centre of the Mahatma Gandhi University. He conducted several training programmes at regional and national levels on literacy, adult education, library science, and language teaching. He was a member of the Faculties of Education and the Board of Studies of the Universities of Kerala and Calicut. He worked as the State Secretary of Deshabhimani Study Circle and as the General Secretary and State Secretary of Progressive Arts and Literature Society.

Pillai published his first story "Oru Nalla Manushyan" on 18 March 1956 in the weekend edition of Deshabandhu. In 1974, he started a printing press called Yuvakala in Calicut after realising the high costs and delays in publishing books. In 1980, the printing press was shifted to Chettikulangara under the name Pratibha Press. He also established a publishing company called Pratibha Books in Chettikulangara, which was inaugurated by Thakazhi Sivasankara Pillai. Pillai closely associated with P. N. Panicker in the activities of Kerala Grandhasala Sangham. An avid book lover, Pillai had a collection of over 25,000 books in his home library.

Pillai published over forty books. His novels include Pennu, Nizhalukal, Lady Teacher, Oru Premathinte Katha, and Malayile Manka. Autographum Neela Kannukalum, Theliyatha Kalpadukal, Pazhaya Bandhavum Puthiya Vazhitharakalum, and Anthivelicham are some of his short story collections. He published several books on education and also authored the book Malayala Sahityam Kalaghattangaliloode, which is a comprehensive history of Malayalam literature over the years.

In 1957, Pillai married S. Saradamma, a native of Chettikulangara in Alleppey district. Pillai who originally hailed from Erumeli lived most of his life in Chettikulangara. Pillai suffered a heart attack on 7 February 2014 and died the same day at a private hospital in Mavelikkara. The Sakthi Erumeli Award given as part of the Abu Dhabi Sakthi Awards, is instituted in his memory.

Bibliography

Fiction
 Novels

 Short story collections

 Children's literature

 One-act play

Non-fiction
 Books on education

 Literary criticism, essays and scholarly literature

 Pen-picture (Thoolikachitram)

References

External links
 Erumeli Parameswaran Pillai at Grandham (in Malayalam)
1932 births
2014 deaths
20th-century Indian novelists
Indian children's writers
Indian literary critics
Indian male essayists
Indian male novelists
Malayalam-language writers
Malayalam literary critics
Malayali people
Writers from Kerala
Recipients of the Kerala Sahitya Akademi Award